Apachería was the term used to designate the region inhabited by the Apache people. The earliest written records have it as a region extending from north of the Arkansas River into what are now the northern states of Mexico and from Central Texas through New Mexico to Central Arizona.

Most notable were the Apaches of the Great Plains in the eastern area of Apachería, located:
south of the Arkansas River in Kansas and eastern Colorado
in Eastern New Mexico
in the Llano Estacado and Central Great Plains of western Oklahoma and Texas, east of the Pecos River and north of the Edwards Plateau.

See also
 Comanchería

Bibliography
 
 Dan L. Thrapp, The Conquest of Apacheria, University of Oklahoma Press, 1979.

See also
Comancheria
Huronia (region) (Wendake)
Lenapehoking
Yazoo lands

Notes

References

Apache
Former regions and territories of the United States
Indigenous culture of the Great Plains
Native American history of Arizona
Native American history of New Mexico
Native American history of Texas
Native American history of Oklahoma
Native American history of Colorado
Native American history of Kansas
History of Chihuahua (state)
History of Coahuila
History of Sonora
Geography of Texas
Geography of Oklahoma
Geography of Colorado
Geography of Kansas
Geography of New Mexico
Geography of Arizona
Geography of Chihuahua (state)
Geography of Coahuila
Geography of Sonora
Eastern New Mexico
Great Plains
Texas Hill Country
Cultural regions